Volkovich is a Russian-language surname of Ruthenian (historical Belarusian) origin, also adopted by Ashkenazi Jews. The Polonized form is Wolkowicz, Ukrainian: Vovkovych (Вовкович ). Modern Belarusian: Vawkovich/Vaukovich, transliterated from Russian: Valkovich. Notable people with the surname include: 
Daniil Volkovich, Soviet Belarusian statesman and politician 
Vladyslav Volkovich, a murderer from  the Ukrainian Nighttime Killers group
 (1856-1924) Russian politician

References

Russian-language surnames